Blum may refer to:

Places
 Kfar Blum, a kibbutz in Israel

United States
 Blum, Texas, a town
 Blum Basin Falls, a waterfall in Washington
 Blum Lakes, six lakes in Washington
 Blum Commercial Maps

Science and technology
 Blum axioms, in computational complexity theory
 Blum integer, in mathematics
 Blum's speedup theorem, in computational complexity theory

Other uses
 Blum (surname), including a list of people with the name
 Julius Blum, a company manufacturing hinges in Austria 
 Blum (film), a 1970 Argentine film

See also
 Blüm
 The Lost Honour of Katharina Blum, a novel by Heinrich Böll
 The Lost Honour of Katharina Blum (film)
 Bloom (disambiguation)
 Blume (disambiguation)
 Blom (surname)